

388001–388100 

|-bgcolor=#f2f2f2
| colspan=4 align=center | 
|}

388101–388200 

|-bgcolor=#f2f2f2
| colspan=4 align=center | 
|}

388201–388300 

|-id=282
| 388282 ʻAkepa ||  || The ʻakepa is a small forest bird native to the Hawaiian Islands. || 
|}

388301–388400 

|-id=370
| 388370 Paulblu ||  || Paul Blu (born 1936) is a French astronomy enthusiast heavily involved in the protection of the night sky. He is Honorary President of ANPCEN (Association Nationale pour la Protection du Ciel et de l'Environnement Nocturnes). || 
|}

388401–388500 

|-bgcolor=#f2f2f2
| colspan=4 align=center | 
|}

388501–388600 

|-bgcolor=#f2f2f2
| colspan=4 align=center | 
|}

388601–388700 

|-bgcolor=#f2f2f2
| colspan=4 align=center | 
|}

388701–388800 

|-bgcolor=#f2f2f2
| colspan=4 align=center | 
|}

388801–388900 

|-bgcolor=#f2f2f2
| colspan=4 align=center | 
|}

388901–389000 

|-bgcolor=#f2f2f2
| colspan=4 align=center | 
|}

References 

388001-389000